Saleniidae is a family of echinoderms belonging to the order Salenioida.

Genera

Genera:
 Acanthosalenia Nicolleau, Martinez & Vadet, 2014
 Bathysalenia Pomel, 1883
 Holosalenia Smith & Wright, 1990

References

Echinacea (animals)
Echinoderm families